Parabole is a genus of moths of the family Noctuidae.

Species
 Parabole rectilinea Hreblay & Ronkay, 1998

References
Natural History Museum Lepidoptera genus database
Parabole at funet

Xyleninae